Mkushi North is a constituency of the National Assembly of Zambia. It covers the towns of Chikoloma, Miloso, Mkushi, Mulungwe and Ngosa in Mkushi District of Central Province.

List of MPs

References

Constituencies of the National Assembly of Zambia
1968 establishments in Zambia
Constituencies established in 1968